In geometry, a decagonal bipyramid is one of the infinite set of bipyramids, dual to the infinite prisms. If a decagonal bipyramid is to be face-transitive, all faces must be isosceles triangles. It is an icosahedron, but not the regular one.

Images 
It can be drawn as a tiling on a sphere, and represents the fundamental domains of [5,2], *5.2.2 symmetry.

See also

External links
 
Virtual Reality Polyhedra The Encyclopedia of Polyhedra
 VRML models <10>
Conway Notation for Polyhedra Try: dP10

Polyhedra